Cazaci may refer to several villages in Romania:

 Cazaci, a village in Nucet Commune, Dâmbovița County
 Cazaci, a village in Tarcău Commune, Neamț County